Metrical Stress Theory: Principles and Case Studies is a 1995 book by Bruce Hayes in which the author discusses metrical stress theory based on in-depth analyses of stress patterns of a large number of languages.

Reception
The book was reviewed by Rene Kager, Omid Tabibzadeh and Shin-ichi Tanaka.

References 

1995 non-fiction books
Phonology books
University of Chicago Press books